Murco Petroleum Limited is an oil refining company based in the United Kingdom. It was set up by Murphy Oil Corporation in 1960. The company owns a forecourt-based chain of convenience stores of Costcutter. Murco purchased a 30% stake in Amoco’s Milford Haven Refinery in 1981, and the remaining 70% in 2007.

In 2008, the firm purchased Petrol Express Limited for £52 million from its parent company GNE Group, acquiring 63 petrol stations to bring its total to 230.

It was announced in November 2014 that Milford Haven Refinery was to close with the loss of around 350 jobs.

References

External links

Automotive fuel retailers
Oil and gas companies of the United Kingdom
Filling stations in the United Kingdom